Le Caprice was a restaurant in London's St James's area famous for being frequented by celebrities. It was originally opened by Mario Gallati in 1947 at 20 Arlington St. Famous patrons included Princess Diana.

It closed in 2020. Its owners plan to reopen it in a new location.

References

External links 
 

1947 establishments in the United Kingdom
Defunct restaurants in London
Restaurants in London